Route 344 is a minor highway located on New World Island in the Canadian province of Newfoundland and Labrador.  It starts at its eastern terminus at an intersection on Route 340 (Road to the Isles), in the town of Summerford, and ends at its western terminus, the town of Cottlesville.

Major intersections

References

344